Paraphrynus is a genus of whip spiders, also known as tailless whip scorpions (order Amblypygi), of the family Phrynidae. It is distributed from the southwestern United States to Central America, including several Caribbean islands. Most species are endemic to Mexico.

Taxonomy 

This genus can be told apart from Phrynus by observing the patella of the pedipalp, which in Phrynus has one small spine between the two largest, while Paraphrynus has two. It can be distinguished from Acantophrynus by its lack of spines in the frontal region of the carapace. The remaining member of the family Phrynidae, Heterophrynus, does not seem to be sympatric with any species of this genus.

There are about 18 species:
 Paraphrynus aztecus (Pocock, 1894)
 Paraphrynus baeops (Mullinex, 1975)
 Paraphrynus carolynae Armas, 2012 
 Paraphrynus chacmool (Rowland, 1973)
 Paraphrynus chiztun (Rowland, 1973)
 Paraphrynus cubensis Quintero, 1983
 Paraphrynus emaciatus Mullinex, 1975
 Paraphrynus grubbsi Cokendolpher and Sissom, 2001
 Paraphrynus laevifrons (Pocock, 1894)
 Paraphrynus leptus Mullinex, 1975
 Paraphrynus macrops (Pocock, 1894)
 Paraphrynus maya Armas, Trujillo & Agreda 2017
 Paraphrynus mexicanus (Bilimek, 1867)
 Paraphrynus olmeca  Armas & Trujillo 2018
 Paraphrynus pococki Mullinex, 1975
 Paraphrynus raptator (Pocock, 1902)
 Paraphrynus reddelli Mullinex, 1979
 Paraphrynus robustus (Franganillo, 1931)
 Paraphrynus velmae Mullinex, 1975
 Paraphrynus viridiceps (Pocock, 1894)
 Paraphrynus williamsi Moreno, 1940

Biology
Like other Amblypygi, the species in this genus are nocturnal predators that dwell in moist microenvironments. Some species are troglophiles and some are true troglobites. They feed upon insects and other arachnids. 
Paraphrynus have flattened bodies that are approximately 3/8” (3-11 mm) long, with spiny pedipalps and antennae-like legs referred to as antenniform legs. The front, first pair of legs are long filamentous or whip-like tips, while the other 3 pairs of legs are positioned to the side, crablike. The longer front legs are sensory organs that are used to "feel" about and locate its prey, which they then ensnare with the spiny pedipalps. Research conducted by biologists also found that the front legs of P. laevifronsis are used to navigate to their refuge prior to dawn, usually spending the night hunting for prey on the vertical surfaces of tree trunks in a neotropical environment.

References

Amblypygi
Cave arachnids